"Findin' a Good Man" is a song recorded by American country music artist Danielle Peck.  It was released in February 2006 as the second single from her debut album Danielle Peck.  The song was written by Casey Koesel, Brian Dean Maher and Jeremy Stover.

Content
The narrator addresses the struggles she and her girl friends go through in order to find men that meet their expectations.

Composition
The song is set in the key of D-flat major at a tempo of 104 beats per minute.

Music video
The music video was directed by Shaun Silva and premiered in April 2006.

Chart performance
"Findin' a Good Man" debuted at number 58 on the U.S. Billboard Hot Country Songs chart for the week of March 18, 2006.

Year-end charts

References

2006 singles
2006 songs
Danielle Peck songs
Music videos directed by Shaun Silva
Big Machine Records singles
Songs written by Jeremy Stover
Song recordings produced by Jeremy Stover